Bora Bora (French: Bora-Bora; Tahitian: Pora Pora) is an island group in the Leeward Islands. The Leeward Islands comprise the western part of the Society Islands of French Polynesia, which is an overseas collectivity of the French Republic in the Pacific Ocean. Bora Bora is part of the Commune of Bora-Bora, which also includes the atoll of Tūpai. The languages spoken in Bora Bora are Tahitian and French. However, due to the high tourism population, many natives of Bora Bora have learned to speak English.

Bora Bora is a major international tourist destination, famous for its seaside (and even offshore) luxury resorts. The major settlement, Vaitape, is on the western side of the main island, opposite the main channel leading into the lagoon. Produce of the island is mostly limited to what can be obtained from the sea and from the plentiful coconut trees, which were historically of economic importance for the production of copra.

Name
In ancient times the island was called , meaning "created by the gods" in the local Tahitian language. This was often abbreviated  meaning simply "first born". The Tahitian, along with the English, French and Dutch languages each use a unique set of phonemes, so the spelling and pronunciation of the name changes as it passes from one language to another. Since Tahitian does not distinguish between the sounds [] and [], the sound represented by  lies between the two, and  represents a sound not present in English similar in sound to [] and []. When explorer Jacob Roggeveen first landed on the island, he and his crew adopted the name , which has stood ever since.

History

The island was inhabited by Polynesian settlers around the 3rd century. The first European sighting was made by Jakob Roggeveen in 1722.

James Cook sighted the island on 29 July 1769, with the help of a Tahitian navigator, Tupaia. The London Missionary Society arrived in 1820 and founded a Protestant church in 1890. Bora Bora was an independent kingdom until 1888, when the French annexed the island as a colony and forced its last queen, Teriimaevarua III, to abdicate.

World War II
During World War II, the United States chose Bora Bora as a South Pacific military supply base, and constructed an oil depot, an airstrip, a seaplane base, and defensive fortifications. The base, known as "Operation Bobcat", comprised nine ships,  of equipment, and nearly 7,000 soldiers.

At least eight 7-inch guns were operated by some members of the 13th Coast Artillery Regiment (later renamed the 276th Coast Artillery Battalion). The guns were set up at strategic points around the island to protect it against potential military attack. All eight of these guns remain in the area to this day.

However, the island saw no combat. The American presence on Bora Bora went uncontested for the entire course of the war. The base was officially closed on 2 June 1946. The World War II airstrip was never enlarged to accommodate large aircraft, but it was nonetheless French Polynesia's only international airport until 1960, when Faa'a International Airport opened next to Papeete, Tahiti.

Geography 
It also has around it several motus, which are small elongated islets that usually have some width and vegetation. One of the most beautiful and photographed motus in Polynesia is the Tapu motu, especially before a hurricane carried away part of the tongues of sand at its ends.

Dimensions 
The highest point is Mount Otemanu,  [Wysi.gif].

Description 
Bora-Bora is formed by an extinct volcano, surrounded by a lagoon and a fringing reef.

The main island has three open bays overlooking the lagoon: Faanui Bay, Tuuraapuo Bay or Povai Bay to the west, and Hitiaa Bay to the northwest. Tuuraapuo Bay separates the main island from two islets of volcanic nature: Toopua and Toopua-iti.

Necklace-shaped coral reefs surround the central island and protect it from the open sea as if it were a dike. It is a barrier reef with only one opening to the ocean: the Teavanui Passage, located west of the main island, which allows most large cargo ships and cruise ships to enter the lagoon.

They must, however, stay in a channel because outside the channel, much of the lagoon water is shallow. The barrier reef is very wide in some sections, where it exceeds two kilometers in width to the southwest of the island. To the east and north of the island, the reef supports a series of islets made up of coral ruins and sand (the motu). Precisely, on one of them that is located to the north, the Motu Mute, is where the U.S. Army built an important air base during the Second World War, which has now become the airport of Bora-Bora.

The lagoon, very abundant in fish, is remarkable for its breadth and beauty. Its color varies with depth: dark indigo when it is deep (Teavanui Passage, Poofai and Faanui bays), all pastel shades of blue and green elsewhere. Corals, when they are very close to the surface, along with the fauna that colonizes them, come to wear a wide variety of colors: egg yolk, red, blue or purple.

Geology 
Bora-Bora is part of a group of volcanic islands linked to the activity of a hazardous area. It is an extinct volcano, which was active in the Upper Pliocene (between 3.45 and 3.10 million years ago), and then underwent at least partial depression and strong erosion under a hot and humid tropical climate.

The volcanic rocks are of basaltic type (essentially from alkaline basalts and some hawaiites, as well as some gabbro intrusions, especially on the islet Toopua). They come mostly from voids, explosive episodes being very rare.

Climate 
Bora Bora has a tropical monsoon climate. Temperatures are relatively consistent throughout the year, with hot days and warm nights. The dry season lasts from June to October, but there is some precipitation even during those months.

 The rainy season is between November and April, with a heavy atmosphere and sometimes violent storms resulting in heavy rains. These rains can last for several days, but this does not preclude many sunny days during the wet season. The humidity level usually ranges from 75% to 90%, sometimes reaching 100%. The dry season is between April and October, with warm and fairly dry weather, but the trade winds sometimes blow strongly. The days are still sunny, but although the dry season is present, this does not prevent the occurrence of some showers or even thunderstorms in the afternoon.

During the dry season, the average humidity level remains between 45 and 60%, but sometimes this level rises spontaneously to 80%, especially at night, when the ground heat remains high and exceeds a certain threshold. These "dry season" storms will occur in the afternoon.

Tourism

The island's economy is driven almost entirely by tourism. Several resorts have been built on the  surrounding the lagoon. ( is a Tahitian word meaning “small islands.”) Hotel Bora Bora opened in 1961, and nine years later the first over-water bungalows on stilts over the lagoon were built. Today, over-water bungalows are a standard feature of most Bora Bora resorts. The bungalows range from relatively inexpensive basic accommodations to very luxurious expensive ones.

Most of the tourist destinations are sea-oriented; however, there are also tourist attractions on land, such as World War II cannons. Air Tahiti operates five or six flights daily between Tahiti and the Bora Bora Airport on Motu Mute (as well as occasional flights to and from other islands). There is no public transport on the island, so rental cars and bicycles are the recommended means of transport. In addition, there are small, two-seater buggies for hire in Vaitape, and motorboats can be rented to explore the lagoon. Vaitape is a large city on the west side of the island and is home to a large part of the island’s population. The city has also become a popular spot for tourism.

Snorkeling and scuba diving in and around Bora Bora’s lagoon are popular activities. Many species of sharks and rays inhabit the surrounding waters. A few dive operators on the island offer manta-ray dives and shark-feeding dives. (The species of shark living in the island's lagoon are not considered dangerous to people.)

In addition to the existing islands of Bora Bora, the artificial island of Motu Marfo has been added in the northeastern corner of the lagoon at one of the many resorts.

Places of interest 

The main attraction of Bora Bora is the lagoon with its still intact underwater world. By glass bottom boat, diving and snorkeling, you can explore the reef with thousands of colorful coral fish. In the deep lagoon there are barracudas and sharks that you can feed during guided diving excursions. An attraction for divers is the "Stingray Strait", an area of the lagoon where several species of stingrays are found in large schools, including numerous manta rays and leopard rays.

Parts of the interior of the island can be explored on jeep safaris. However, the natural beauty of the island is best explored on foot. Several hikes can be done from Vaitape, but it is advisable to rely on a guide to keep your bearings. The hike to the top of Mount Pahia, from where, according to legend, the war god Oro descended on a rainbow, leads through orchards, forests, orchid fields and fern-covered crevices. You can also climb Mount Otemanu, which offers a beautiful panoramic view of the atoll. Below the summit is a large grotto where numerous frigate birds nest.

Another attraction are the remains of what were more than 40 marae (ceremonial platforms). The best preserved are Marae Fare Opu, in Faanui Bay, and Marae Aehau-tai or Temaruteaoa, at the eastern end of Vairau Bay. Another large Aboriginal ceremonial site is Marae Marotitini, in the north of the main island, right on the beach. Two stone box tombs of the royal family were found in the area of the complex.

Most beaches (and also the numerous hotels) are located in the two large bays between Pointe Paopao and Pointe Matira, in the southwest of the island, as well as in the Motus opposite. About five kilometers south of Vaitape, directly on the main road, is Bloody Mary's, a bar and restaurant with its own yacht jetty, frequented by many guests. The two wooden plaques at the entrance list 230 names, including Marlon Brando, Jane Fonda and Diana Ross.

Flora and fauna 

In the relatively densely populated and intensively used lowland regions for a Polynesian atoll, hardly any remnants of the original vegetation remain. In contrast, the flora of the high, steep mountains, which are difficult to access, remains largely unspoiled.

The back beach areas are fringed with low-lying, heavily vegetated Cordia subcordata and Hibiscus tiliaceus. A cultivated form, Hibiscus tiliaceus var. sterilis, with a straight trunk and a nice rounded crown, is often planted as roadside vegetation.

Up to the foot of the steep mountainous region there is mainly cultivated land with plantations of coconut palms, breadfruit trees, Tahitian chestnuts (Inocarpus), cassava (Manihot), tropical fruits, as well as orchid plantations for the decoration of tourist hotels. Abandoned areas have been conquered by overgrown guavas and the fern Dicranopteris linearis.

The crevices and ridges of the island's mountains are covered with still little disturbed remnants of the island's original vegetation. These include groves of metrosider trees, stands of Wikstroemia coriacea, a species of the daphne family endemic to Polynesia, and a few species of Glochidion. The humid and shady crevices are densely populated with ferns.

Historically, Bora Bora’s virgin forest habitats, on the slopes of Mount Otemanu, had a very diverse assortment of snail and slug species (gastropods) compared to other islands. Several species of endemic or native species existed in great numbers until relatively recently. However, after Lissachatina, Euglandina and various flatworms were introduced to the island, they had wiped out the populations of the endemic partulid species Partula lutea the late 1990s), Samoana attenuata (a species once native to Bora Bora but later not found in surveys of the island), and Mautodontha boraborensis (a critically endangered species as of 1996 but most likely extinct, as it was last seen in the 1880s). The above listed native and endemic species were mostly restricted to virgin forest, and the only species that remain common (perhaps even extant) are several subulinids and tornatellinids among others, including Orobophana pacifica (a helicinid).

Many species of sharks and rays inhabit the strip of water surrounding the island. There are dive operators that offer dives to observe the fish and watch the sharks feed. In addition to the existing islets in Bora Bora, there is a new artificial area in the northeast corner of the lagoon on the St. Regis Resort property.

Demographics 
In 2012 the population was 9858 which increased to 10,605 according to 2017 estimates.

Religion 
Christianity is the dominant religion since the arrival of Christian missionaries in the 19th century when it replaced the old traditional beliefs that Europeans considered idolatry. Vaitape was founded by British missionary John Muggridge Orsmond (1788–1856) of the London Missionary Society, He came to Bora Bora from Tahiti in 1824 and built first a church and then a wharf, roads and houses, as well as a missionary school made of coral rock. This settlement, called "Beulah", became what is now Vaitape.

With the establishment of the French protectorate, the presence of the Catholic Church was reinforced and today it administers a church in the capital of the island (Vaitape) called Saint-Pierre-Célestin Church (Église de Saint-Pierre-Célestin). It depends on the Metropolitan Archdiocese of Papeete with its seat in Tahiti.

Numerous pre-Christian relics of the native Polynesians of Bora Bora are still preserved today: remains of 13 ceremonial platforms (marae) - there used to be more than forty - and many petroglyphs, which, however, are mostly hidden in inaccessible bushes. The best preserved ceremonial site is the Marae Fare Opu in Faʻanui Bay, located directly on the beach. Today, the road runs through the area, so the overview of the site, which is quite large, has been lost. The site consisted of a rectangular, level area bounded by boulders and a stone platform. The rectangular platform is bounded by limestone slabs over 1 m high and filled with earth. Two of the slabs on the north side have stone carvings with turtle motifs.

Languages 
French as in the rest of France is the only official language and this along with Tahitian are the main languages spoken by its inhabitants in a common way. In addition the people in contact with tourists generally have some basic knowledge of English. Most visitors to Bora Bora are Americans, Australians, Japanese or Europeans.

Politics and government 
The atoll has been part of France since the 19th century. Its island capital is Vaitape. Tupai Atoll, nearby and uninhabited, is an administrative dependency of Bora Bora. Bora Bora is also a municipality, consisting of the island of Bora Bora and the atoll of Tupai. The mayor of Bora Bora has been Gaston Tong Sang since 9 July 1989.

Bora Bora is politically part of French Polynesia. The island is a French overseas territory and is not part of the European Union. It is administered by a subdivision (Subdivision administrative des Îles sous le Vent) of the High Commissariat of the Republic in French Polynesia (Haut-commissariat de la République en Polynésie française) based in Papeete. Bora Bora is one of the seven municipalities of the Leeward Islands Administrative Subdivision, and in turn is subdivided into the three submunicipalities (Communes associées) of Nunue, Faʻanui (plus Tupai Atoll, further north) and Anau. The currency is the CFP franc, which is pegged to the euro.

Transportation 
Rental cars and bicycles are the recommended system of transportation. There are also helicopter tours, and off-road vehicle or catamaran rentals in Vaitape. On the main island, a public bus (Le Truck) travels around the island in about an hour along the ring road. Stops are not necessary; the bus stops wherever passengers want. However, the preferred means of transport for tourists are bicycle and moped or motorcycle and the shuttle service offered by some hotels. Small electric cars can be rented in Vaitape. There is a private helicopter stationed on the island, which is used for tourist flights.

Sports 
In terms of sports, Bora Bora is, along with neighboring Huahine, Raiatea and Tahaa, one of the four islands among which the Hawaiki Nui Va'a, an international competition of Polynesian canoes (va'a), is held.

See also 

 List of volcanoes in French Polynesia
 List of reduplicated place names
 Administrative divisions of French Polynesia

References

External links

 Bora Bora from space (2598 × 3071, 9.5 MB)
 https://weather-and-climate.com/average-monthly-Rainfall-Temperature-Sunshine,Bora-Bora,French-Polynesia

 
Islands of the Society Islands
Volcanoes of French Polynesia